Tomás Ángel Gutiérrez (born 20 February 2003) is a Colombian footballer who plays as a forward for Atlético Nacional. He was included in The Guardian's "Next Generation 2020". He is the son of former footballer Juan Pablo Ángel.

Career statistics

Club

Notes

References

2003 births
Living people
Colombian footballers
Colombia youth international footballers
Association football forwards
Categoría Primera A players
Atlético Nacional footballers
Footballers from Medellín